Switzerland's Next Topmodel is a Swiss reality television series and the second local adaptation based on Tyra Banks' America's Next Top Model after Supermodel which aired in 2007 and 2008 on the now defunct network 3+. The show sees a number of aspiring models compete against each other in a variety of competitions to determine who will win the title of Switzerland's Next Topmodel, among other prizes in hopes of a successful career in the modelling industry.

History
Production of the show was officially announced in September 2017. Host and judges were announced in April 2018.

Format
Coming from the same production company, both in general look and concept the show takes a lot of inspiration from Germany's Next Top Model. For the first season, the team format (being intact on GNTM since its eleventh season) was adapted with the judges acting as mentors for some parts of the contestants whereas the final say will exclusively be left to the decision of the host equalling the role of Heidi Klum on GNTM.

Judges

Cycles

References

German-language television shows
Swiss television series
2018 Swiss television series debuts
2010s reality television series
Non-American television series based on American television series
2010s Swiss television series
ProSieben Schweiz